Lurano is a comune (municipality) in the Province of Bergamo in the Italian region of Lombardy, located about  northeast of Milan and about  south of Bergamo.

Lurano borders the following municipalities: Arcene, Brignano Gera d'Adda, Castel Rozzone, Pognano, Spirano.

Demographic evolution

References